The men's 10 kilometre sprint biathlon competition at the 1980 Winter Olympics was held on 19 February, at Lake Placid Olympic Sports Complex Cross Country Biathlon Center. In sprint, competitors race over three loops of the skiing course, shooting two times, once prone and once standing, with each miss being penalized by requiring the competitor to race over a 150-metre penalty loop.

Results 

The sprint was added to the world championships in 1974, and made its Olympic debut in Lake Placid. Two-time defending world champion Frank Ullrich was more than 10 seconds clear after the first shoot, and despite two misses at the second shoot, he actually saw his lead increase, allowing him to pull away in the final section and win by more than 40 seconds. Vladimir Alikin, Kjell Søbak, Erkki Antila and Anatoly Alyabyev were closely matched after the first shoot, but Alikin, who shot clear, and Alyabyev, who missed once, pulled clear for silver and bronze, while Antila missed two shots and Søbak fell off the skiing pace.

References

Sprint